The 1984 Missouri lieutenant gubernatorial election was held on November 6, 1984. Democratic nominee Harriett Woods defeated Republican nominee Mel Hancock with 53.82% of the vote.

Primary elections
Primary elections were held on August 7, 1984.

Democratic primary

Candidates
Harriett Woods, State Senator
LeRoy D. Braungardt, State Representative

Results

Republican primary

Candidates
Mel Hancock, businessman
Nate Walker, State Representative
Tom Baldwin
David R. Countie, former State Representative

Results

General election

Candidates
Harriett Woods, Democratic
Mel Hancock, Republican

Results

References

1984
Gubernatorial
Missouri